The history of cooperatives in the United States extends to pre-independence times. With the exception of credit unions and mutual banking institutions, most cooperatives have held a comparatively light footprint on the economic history of the United States in comparison to the economies of Europe.

18th century

Colonial era
The earliest mutual organization established in the British North American colonies was created in 1735 in Charleston, South Carolina, but was liquidated following a 1740 fire which gutted much of the city's buildings and had left the company unable to recoup the losses. The Philadelphia Contributionship mutual insurance company, founded by Benjamin Franklin in 1752, is the oldest continuing mutual insurance company in the continental United States.

19th century
The Boston Mechanics' and Laborers' Mutual Benefit Association was founded in 1845 as a mutual organization styled after the British Rochdale Pioneers.

20th century
On May 20, 2019, the National Register of Historic Places in the United States, listed two four story sixteen apartment buildings, Alku 1 and Alku Toinen, (Finnish for Beginning 1 and 2), located at 816 and 826 43rd Street, Kings County Brooklyn New York, as the first two coop buildings in the US, built by Finnish immigrants, on the National Register of Historic Places. Previously, on March 21, 2019, the New York State Office of Parks, Recreation and Historic Preservation designated both buildings as Historic Sites in New York State. United States Department of the Interior, National Park Service / National Register of Historic Places Registration Form NPS Form 10-900 OMB No. 1024-0018 (Expires 5/31/2012)
Alku & Alku Toinen DRAFT Kings County, NY, Name of Property County and State, Sections 9-end page 9

By 1920, there were 2,600 consumer co-ops in the United States – all but eleven were general stores – and 80% were in towns with populations of less than 2,500. Combined sales volume for these stores was about US$260 million.

Great Depression
Upton Sinclair's EPIC movement became one of the leading proponents for the establishment of self-help cooperatives in California during the Great Depression, as was Japanese pacifist Toyohiko Kagawa, who advocated for "brotherhood economics" as an alternative to communism and fascism on both sides of the Pacific. This advocacy for cooperatives, combined with then-president Franklin Roosevelt's New Deal, culminated in the establishment of cooperatives in Berkeley, California, Palo Alto, Eau Claire, Wisconsin, Hanover, New Hampshire,  Hyde Park, Chicago (closed January 2008), and Greenbelt, Maryland. While all these cooperatives lasted to at least their fiftieth anniversaries, the Consumers' Cooperative of Berkeley ultimately closed down, the Eau Claire and Palo Alto cooperatives scaled back their activities, and the Hanover, and Greenbelt cooperatives have survived to this day.

Credit unions, in particular, were established throughout the United States and have remained one of the most visible and productive legacies of the New Deal period.

21st century
In the healthcare reform debate, health insurance cooperatives were, at one point, proposed as an alternative to the public option, and indeed in some states were instituted as the ACA became law.

In 2009, the United Steelworkers signed an agreement with the Basque Country-based Mondragon Corporation in order to further the establishment and expansion of unionized worker cooperatives in North America.

The National Cooperative Business Association identifies over 29,000 cooperative businesses employing more than 2 million people and accounting for over $650 billion in annual revenue.

References

Cooperatives in the United States
Economic history of the United States
Cooperative movement
History of the United States by topic